Matloff is a surname. Notable people with the surname include:

 Judith Matloff (born 1958), American journalist
 Norman Matloff (born 1948), American computer scientist